Charles Erastus Colton was an American architect who worked in Syracuse, New York.

Buildings he designed which survive and are listed on the U.S. National Register of Historic Places include:
Syracuse City Hall, 233 E. Washington St., Syracuse, New York
Gere Bank Building, 121 E. Water St. Syracuse NY
 Leavenworth Apartments, 615 James St. Syracuse NY
People's African Methodist Episcopal Zion Church (with (Wallace Rayfield), 711 E. Fayette St., Syracuse NY
Baldwinsville Village Hall, 16 W. Genesee St., Baldwinsville, New York
St. John's Episcopal Church (The Center for Wellness), Auburn, New York
Two buildings in the South Salina Street Downtown Historic District, Syracuse, New York:
McCarthy Building, 217 S. Salina Street
Wilson Building, 306-312 S. Salina Street, 1898.  Beaux-Arts style building was originally known as Dillaye Building.
Seubert & Warner Building, 239-41 West Fayette Street, included in the Armory Square Historic District, Syracuse, New York

He also designed the Iroquois China Company plant in Solvay, New York. The contractors for masonry work, O'Connor Bros., began excavation for the foundation walls by July 1904; the plant was in production in 1905. Charles Colton also built 745-747 N.Salina St, Syracuse, NY

References

Architects from Syracuse, New York
Year of death missing
Year of birth missing